The Christopher Columbus statue in Newburgh, New York, was erected in 1992 by UNICO, an Italian American service organization active in the city. At the time, the majority of white residents in the city identified as Italian American, and as with most Columbus monuments, felt the statue represented their community. It commemorated the 500th anniversary of Columbus's voyage in 1492. This monument is one of two in the city conceived in recognition of Italian Americans.

Description 
The monument stands in a fenced-off flower garden, forming the center of Unico Park on the Newburgh Waterfront. At the time of its construction, development on the waterfront was steadily beginning. UNICO commissioned the statue from Pompeian Studios of Bronxville; it was shipped there from their foundry at Villa Ilice in the Italian city of Carrara. The statue points an outstretched arm towards the Atlantic Ocean, with a small bundle of rope and anchor at its feet.

History

Vandalism 
During Columbus Day week in 2018, the statue's hands were painted red, and on its base the word "HISTORY" was spray painted. The UNICO chapter was notified, as were the police. Following the removal of statues as part of George Floyd protests, Newburghers have started a petition to the city council asking for the statue's replacement.

See also

 1992 in art

References

External links
 

Buildings and structures in Newburgh, New York
Monuments and memorials in New York (state)
Outdoor sculptures in New York (state)
Sculptures of men in New York (state)
Statues in New York (state)
Newburgh, New York
Vandalized works of art in New York (state)